Karin Putsch-Grassi  is a potter.

Biography

After an apprenticeship in the studio of Albrecht Kiedaisch in Tübingen Putsch-Grassi began her studies in ceramics 1982 at "Istituto statale d’Arte” in Florence with Salvatore and Stefano Cipolla.

Her most recent work follows a newly developed technique named "Figulinae", which consists of assembling soft raw stoneware or porcelain vessels and compressing them to form a new entity.

Putsch-Grassi's work has been exhibited in personal exhibitions in Italy, Germany, Poland and Japan as well as in numerous group exhibitions worldwide. Furthermore her works are displayed in European Museums.  Putsch-Grassi is an elected member of the International Academy of Ceramics.

Awards (selection) 
 2012 First Prize “Rassegna Internazionale di Ceramica Contemporanea”, Albissola Marittima 
 2016 Second Prize "Ceramic & Colours Award", Faenza 
 2021 Third Prize "Premio MIDeC per Design Ceramico", Cerro di Laveno Mombello

References

Sources 
 Website of the International Academy of Ceramics
Flyer of Karin Putsch-Grassi's Personal Exhibion inside the Civiltà Contadina Museum in Figline Valdarno
Catalog of Putsch-Grassi's Kyoto exhibition in 2017
Ceramics Monthly, September 2015, (Statement of Putsch-Grassi and pictures of her work), p. 42

 Ugo La Pietra. "Fittile. Artigianato artistico Italiano della ceramica contemporanea" , p. 50

Documentation in publications 
 Ray Hemachandra, Jim Romberg: 500 Raku. Bold Explorations of a Dynamic Ceramics Technique, New York 2011, 
 Linda Kopp: The Best of 500 Ceramics. Celebrating a Decade in Clay, New York 2012, p. 336
 Duncan Hooson, Anthony Quinn: The Workshop Guide to Ceramics: A Fully Illustrated Step-by-Step Manual. Techniques and Principles of Design, Barron's 2012, 
 Edoardo Pilia. Ceramica Artistica: materiali, tecniche, storia, pp. 98–99
 Duncan Hooson and Anthony Quinn. The Workshop Guide to Ceramics, Thames & Hudson, pp. 211, 218, 248 
 Ray Hemachandra and Julia Galloway. 500 Vases: Contemporary Explorations of a Timeless Form, Lark Books, pp. 68, 272

External links 
 Website Karin Putsch-Grassi
 Website of the exhibition „Terre lavorate“

1960 births
Living people
20th-century German artists
20th-century German women artists
21st-century German women artists
Alumni of Goldsmiths, University of London
German potters
Women potters
German ceramists
German women ceramists